Route 14 is a numbered state highway in the U.S. state of Rhode Island.

Route description
Route 14 starts at the Connecticut border at an intersection with Connecticut routes 14 and 14A. It runs northeast past the northern terminus of Route 117, and then turns north at an intersection with Rhode Island Route 102. It runs concurrent with Route 102 for a while, and crosses two arms of the Scituate Reservoir on causeways. Route 14 continues east and intersects I-295 at exit 4, then continues towards downtown Providence before ending at the US 6 expressway near the Huntington Expressway.

History

Route 14 roughly runs along the historic Providence and Norwich Turnpike, later renamed to "Plainfield Pike". Half of the bypassed road is currently submerged under the Scituate Reservoir. The bypassed section, a road called "Old Plainfield Pike" can be driven by car from its beginning at Route 102 to Route 12. The original road continues past Route 12 as a paved path. This paved path continues for approximately .25 miles up to the Scituate Reservoir, at which point the path is underwater for approximately a mile. It resurfaces out of the Reservoir on the northeast side and continues for another .25 miles and then rejoins with Route 14. The pavement between Route 12 and the Reservoir, and between the Reservoir and Route 14 on the northeast side, is believed to be original from before the Reservoir was created.

Major intersections

References

External links

2019 Highway Map, Rhode Island

014
Transportation in Kent County, Rhode Island
Transportation in Providence County, Rhode Island